Hong Kong ICT Awards is a technology-related award in Hong Kong, organised annually by the Office of the Government Chief Information Officer of the Innovation and Technology Bureau of the Government of Hong Kong.

The award has 8 categories: Smart Business, Digital Enterteinment, FinTech, ICT Startup, Smart Living, Smart People, Smart Mobility, and Student Innovation. Awardees receive widespread media coverage every year.

See also 

 List of computer science awards

References

Information science awards